The Bolwell Nagari is a sports car produced by Bolwell in Australia. The original Mk VIII Nagari was built from 1970 to 1974 and the Mk X Nagari was launched in 2008.

Mk VIII Nagari

Nagari is an aboriginal word meaning "flowing," and the Bolwell Nagari, also known as the Mk VIII, was the company's first full production sports car with 100 coupes and 18 convertibles made. It was manufactured from 1970 to 1974 and became the best known out of the 9 Bolwell car designs: the Mk I-VIII and Ikara. Other components came from Ford (suspension and dampers) and Austin 1800 (steering).

Motorsport
The Nagari was a popular choice of production sports car in the early ‘70s, competing in the Australian Sports Car Championship (ASCC). Peter Warren won the 1975 Australian Tourist Trophy for Production Sports Cars driving a Bolwell Nagari.

Mk X Nagari

In late 2006 it was announced that the Bolwell company intended to produce a new, carbon fibre-bodied car under the 'Nagari' name
and the model was confirmed for production in 2008. The prototype debuted at the 2008 Melbourne International Motor Show and the 2008 Sydney International Motor Show. It is a mid-engined two-seater coupé with a carbon-fibre tub, front and rear subframes and a carbon-reinforced composite body. Power comes from a fettled 2GR-FE 3.5L V6 engine sourced from the Toyota Aurion, which is available either as naturally aspirated or fitted with an optional Sprintex supercharger. Initially the Nagari was available with only a 6-speed automatic (with or without paddle shifting), however a 6-speed manual transmission was later developed. DC5-model Honda Integra tail-lights are used in the exterior. Standard features are limited, with prices starting around $150,000 AUD for a basic model, and can range up to $260,000 for a top-spec model with the supercharged engine and manual transmission.

References

External links 
 The Bolwell Car Company and the new Nagari
 The 2008 Bolwell Nagari on YouTube
 New Nagari at 2008 Melbourne Motor Show
 Bolwell owner's club
 Bolwell.com of Australia
 Bolwell Reviews & Road-tests
 Project Nagari - Project Car Build
 'Bolwell' - Company product publication

Cars of Australia
1960s cars
1970s cars
2010s cars
2020s cars
Automobiles with backbone chassis